O'o is an album by John Zorn released in 2009. It the second album by The Dreamers following their 2008 release The Dreamers. The title refers to the ʻōʻō of the Hawaiian Islands, the last living members of the now-extinct songbird family Mohoidae. The song titles likewise refer extinct or nearly-so birds, from the prehistoric Archaeopteryx lithographica to the Zapata rail of which a few hundred survive in Cuba.

Reception
The Allmusic review by Thom Jurek awarded the album 4 stars stating "O'o is every bit as accessible and fun to listen to as Dreamers is, but in many ways, it's even more satisfying because it feels like a work rather than a collection of tunes. In fact, the only thing more pleasing than listening to this album would be hearing it performed live."

Track listing

All compositions by John Zorn.
 "Miller's Crake" – 4:18
 "Akialoa" – 4:46
 "Po'o'uli" – 5:41
 "Little Bittern" – 6:29
 "Mysterious Starling" – 4:31
 "Laughing Owl" – 4:44
 "Archaeopteryx" – 5:06
 "Solitaire" – 2:10
 "Piopio" – 5:11
 "The Zapata Rail" – 2:52
 "Kakawahie" – 4:14
 "Magdalena" – 5:07

Personnel
Marc Ribot – guitar
Jamie Saft – piano, organ
Kenny Wollesen – vibraphone
Trevor Dunn – bass
Joey Baron – drums
Cyro Baptista – percussion

References

The Dreamers albums
Tzadik Records albums
Albums produced by John Zorn
Music about birds